Stephen Ray Mariucci (born November 4, 1955), nicknamed "Mooch", is an American sportscaster and former football coach who was the head coach of two National Football League (NFL) teams, the San Francisco 49ers (1997–2002) and the Detroit Lions (2003–2005), and for a year at the University of California, Berkeley.

Early years
Mariucci was born and raised in Iron Mountain, Michigan, in the Upper Peninsula, where he met best friend and current Michigan State University basketball head coach Tom Izzo. Both attended Iron Mountain High where they were teammates on the football, basketball, and track teams.

At Northern Michigan University (NMU) in Marquette, where they were roommates, Mariucci was a three-time All-America (Division II) quarterback. As a sophomore in 1975, he led the Wildcats to three postseason wins and the national championship. Mariucci signed with the Hamilton Tiger-Cats of the Canadian Football League in  but was released a month later

Early career
He began his coaching career at his alma mater (1978–79), and moved to Cal State Fullerton  and Louisville  Mariucci's first pro position was as a receivers coach for the USFL's Orlando Renegades in 1985. Later that fall, he had a brief stint in the NFL with the Los Angeles Rams as quality control coach.

Mariucci returned to college football and joined the USC staff in 1986 and coached wide receiver Ken Henry to a season where he had 807 yards with 7 TDs; WR Randy Tanner also had 408 yards 

He then moved to the coaching staff at the University of California, Berkeley (Cal) in 1987. that first season, WR Brian Bedford had 515 yards with 4 TDs and WR Mike Ford had 479 yards   In 1989, WR Brian Treggs had 746 yards 

In 1990 and 1991, he was the Golden Bears' offensive coordinator.  Quarterback Mike Pawlawski threw for 2,069 yards with 17 TDs and RBs Anthony Wallace and Russell White combined to run for 2,002 yards with 16 TDs. In 1991, Pawlawski threw for 2,517 yards with 21 TDs and White ran for 1,177 yards with 14 TDs; WR Sean Dawkins had 723 yards 

Mariucci then moved to the NFL, and became the quarterback coach for the Green Bay Packers in 1992 under new head coach  After four years with the Packers, he returned to Cal as head coach in 1996 and went  ending with an Aloha Bowl loss

Coaching career in professional football
Following his season with the Golden Bears, Mariucci was considered a leading candidate for several NFL head coaching positions, and was hired by the San Francisco 49ers to succeed George Seifert.

In his first season in 1997, the 49ers went  during the regular season, earning home-field advantage in the playoffs in the National Football Conference (NFC). After defeating the Minnesota Vikings in the divisional round, San Francisco hosted the Green Bay Packers in the NFC Championship Game, but lost 23–10 in a muddy, rainy contest at Candlestick Park. The defeat was the 49ers' fourth NFC title loss of the 1990s, following losses to the New York Giants in 1990 and the Dallas Cowboys in 1992 and 1993, and it was their third playoff loss to the Packers in as many seasons. In 1998, the 49ers posted a 12–4 record and returned to the playoffs as a wild-card team, finally beating Green Bay in the Wild Card game but lost 20–18 in the divisional round to the eventual NFC champion Atlanta Falcons. The Wild Card Game saw Terrell Owens drop many passes but redeem himself with The Catch II, scoring the winning touchdown. Two losing seasons followed, but in 2001, the 49ers returned to the playoffs after  season, once again to be eliminated by the Packers.

Mariucci's final season in San Francisco was 2002. The 49ers won the NFC West with a  record and beat the New York Giants in a controversial wild-card game, posting the third-biggest comeback playoff victory in NFL history (second biggest at the time). However, they were crushed  by the eventual Super Bowl champion Tampa Bay Buccaneers in the divisional round. On January 15, 2003, the 49ers fired Mariucci, reportedly after the coach lost a power struggle with general manager Terry Donahue. As San Francisco's coach, he compiled a 60–43 (.583) record, while his teams earned playoff berths four times. His firing caused an uproar among 49er fans, and the franchise struggled heavily, having no winning seasons for 10 years following Mariucci's exit. 

Mariucci was named the Detroit Lions' 22nd head coach on February 4, 2003, and was fired on November 28, 2005. In his abbreviated three seasons in Detroit, he compiled a disappointing  record.  Mariucci's troubles in Detroit were partially attributed by many fans and experts to poor personnel evaluations by then Lions' general manager Matt Millen, who had signed Mariucci to a five-year $25 million guaranteed contract, the NFL's highest coaching contract at the time. During his time in Detroit, the Lions finished no higher than third in their division and never contended for a playoff berth. The decision to fire Mariucci came after a  blowout loss on national television on Thanksgiving Day to the Atlanta Falcons.

During the Brett Favre–Green Bay Packers dispute throughout the 2008 off-season, Favre criticized the Packers for not interviewing Mariucci for their head coaching job in 2006.  Mariucci, who previously worked with Favre, was figured to be a great candidate for the West Coast Offense style played in Green Bay.

Mariucci is one of thirteen head coaches since the AFL–NFL merger in 1970 to lead his team to a division title in his first season. Mariucci established an NFL mark for consecutive wins by a rookie head coach with an 11-game winning streak, which has since been trumped by Jim Caldwell's  start with the Indianapolis Colts during the 2009 season.

Throughout his career, Mariucci coached a high number of players (9) inducted into the Pro Football Hall of Fame in Canton, Ohio. Hall of Fame inductees coached by Mariucci as either their position or head coach include: Tony Gonzalez, Brett Favre, Steve Young, Jerry Rice,  Kevin Greene, Rod Woodson, Chris Doleman, Charles Haley, and Terrell Owens.

Head coaching record

College

NFL

After coaching
Since being fired by the Detroit Lions, Mariucci has not returned to coaching. He has since been hired by NFL Network to work on their show NFL GameDay and contribute as an analyst on NFL Network's four-hour pregame show "NFL GameDay Morning," as well as provide follow-up reports from the late afternoon and Sunday night matchups on "NFL GameDay Highlights."

Mariucci now resides in Monte Sereno, California. He has four children: Stephen, Tyler, Adam, and Brielle. His eldest son Tyler is an assistant athletic director at San Diego State University. Adam works in Real Estate in New York City and his son Stephen is country music artist, Stephen Ray 

In 2011, Mariucci founded the Mariucci Family Foundation. It is a 501(c)(3) non-profit organization dedicated to providing opportunities and support for underserved youth and families. 

Shortly after Pete Carroll left University of Southern California (USC), Mariucci was reportedly seen on campus, and ESPN's Adam Schefter reported shortly thereafter that Mariucci was a candidate for the Trojans head coach position and that the university had "made contact" with the announcer.

Following the dismissal of Arkansas head coach Bobby Petrino in April 2012, Mariucci was recommended as a replacement by Carroll.

Mariucci expressed interest in the head-coaching job of the San Diego Chargers in late 2012 with speculation of Norv Turner's departure from San Diego.

References

1955 births
American football quarterbacks
American people of Italian descent
American players of Canadian football
Cal State Fullerton Titans football coaches
California Golden Bears football coaches
Canadian football quarterbacks
Detroit Lions head coaches
Green Bay Packers coaches
Hamilton Tiger-Cats coaches
Living people
Los Angeles Rams coaches
Louisville Cardinals football coaches
National Football League announcers
Northern Michigan Wildcats football coaches
Northern Michigan Wildcats football players
People from Iron Mountain, Michigan
San Francisco 49ers head coaches
Sportspeople from Michigan
United States Football League coaches
USC Trojans football coaches
Alliance of American Football announcers